Shangrao Sanqingshan Airport  is an airport serving the city of Shangrao in the northeast of Jiangxi province, China. In addition to Shangrao, the airport also serves the nearby cities of Yingtan and Fuzhou, Jiangxi.

The airport was approved by the State Council of China in October 2011, and construction started on 8 July 2012. Shangrao Sanqingshan Airport was budgeted to cost 666 million yuan to build (approximately US$105 million) and was partially funded with a $50 million loan from the World Bank. It was the first Chinese aviation project funded by the World Bank.

The airport opened on 28 May 2017, with an inaugural Sichuan Airlines flight from Chengdu Shuangliu Airport.

Facilities
The airport has a 2,400-meter runway and a 6,000 square-meter terminal building.

Airlines and destinations

See also
List of airports in China
List of the busiest airports in China

References

Airports in Jiangxi
Airports established in 2017
2017 establishments in China
Shangrao
Fuzhou, Jiangxi